Gonzalo Ramos Cantó (born 19 September 1989) is a Spanish actor and singer. He is known for playing lead roles in series Física o Química and Amar en tiempos revueltos.

Career 
Gonzalo Ramos started acting in 2004 when he was 14, playing the role of Jon in the feature film El Guardavías. After that he made many TV appearances playing supporting roles in prime time shows such as Hospital Central, MIR, Génesis, Hermanos y Detectives, Los Hombres de Paco, Hay que Vivir, and others. During those early years of his career, Ramos also appeared in the feature film La Vida en Rojo.

At the age of 18, he played a lead role in the hit Spanish series Física o Química for 3 years. During that time he also worked with director Roland Joffe in the feature film There Be Dragons, and with director Xavi Giménez in the feature film Cruzando el Límite.

Gonzalo was awarded the Atenea de Honor a una carrera emergente in the 2009 Ateneo Coste Cero International Film Festival. He then moved on to the stage to play the lead role Jose in the play Los Ochenta Son Nuestros. He then returned to television to play the lead role of Alberto Cepeda in the Spanish television series Amar en Tiempos Revueltos.

He played the lead role in the short film Y La Muerte Lo Seguía, which has been selected in over 100 festivals all over the world, and has received numerous awards.

After this, he moved to London where he appeared in the musicals A Catered Affair and A Little Night Music, both productions during his postgraduate at the Royal Academy of Music. He returned to Spain to appear as guest star in the TV series Ciega a Citas. During 2014, he directed his first short film Super Yo, with which he won Best Actor Award at the Plasencia International Shortfilm festival.

He then returned to London to play the role of Paulo in the 2015 BBC One prime time series The Interceptor.

In 2020, it is confirmed that the actor will give life to Julio de la Torre Reig in Física o químicaː El reencuentro for the platform Atresplayer Premium.

In 2021, after participating in Física o químicaː El reencuentro it was announced that he had signed for the daily series Acacias 38'' to give life to Rodrigo Lluch.

Personal life 
On 21 September 2013 he married the Portuguese singer and actress, Sofia Escobar in an intimate ceremony in Guimarães, Portugal. On 6 March 2014 the couple's first child, a boy, was born whom they called Gabriel Ramos Escobar.

Ramos speaks Spanish, English, and French.

Filmography

Movies

Television

Videoclips

References

External links 
 Gonzalo Ramos at the Internet Movie Database 
 Gonzalo Ramos on Estamos Rodando 

1989 births
Living people
Male actors from Madrid
Spanish male film actors
Spanish male stage actors
Spanish male television actors
21st-century Spanish male actors